Pappy & Harriet's Pioneertown Palace is a honky-tonk, barbecue restaurant and music venue near Joshua Tree National Park in Pioneertown, California. Accessible from California State Route 62, the restaurant lies four miles northeast of Yucca Valley.

In 1946, a group of filmmakers built a Western-style movie set in the high desert 25 miles north of Palm Springs for the cowboy actors Roy Rogers and Gene Autry. Production designers decorated the facades of "Main Street" with a Western saloon, bank, chapel and a cantina. Pioneertown and its cantina were used in more than 50 films and television programs throughout the 1940s and 1950s, including The Cisco Kid and Judge Roy Bean. In 1972, John Aleba and his wife Francis purchased the building and John further developed the property into a cantina.

1946-1982

In 1946, at the site where Pappy & Harriet's stands today, filmmakers built a cantina set that was used in numerous Westerns during the 1950s. In 1972, Harriet's mother, Francis Aleba, purchased the building and opened The Cantina, an outlaw biker burrito bar. The Cantina rollicked for 10 years before its closing.

1982-2004 

In 1982, Aleba's daughter Harriet and her husband, Claude "Pappy" Allen, bought The Cantina and renamed it Pappy & Harriet's Pioneertown Palace. With its family style Tex-Mex cuisine and live music, The Cantina often featured Pappy, Harriet, and their granddaughter Kristina, and became a local haunt for bikers.
 
When Pappy Allen died in 1994, hundreds of mourners from around the world attended his memorial, including Victoria Williams, who later recorded the song "Happy to Have Known Pappy" for her Atlantic Records release, Loose.

A local airplane pilot, Jay Hauk, owned Pappy and Harriet's before it was bought by two New Yorkers, Linda Krantz and Robyn Celia.

In the summer of 2006, the Sawtooth Complex fire threatened Pappy & Harriet's and the rest of Pioneertown, but the town and club were not among the 50 homes and over 60,000 acres of desert burned.

2003-2020 

In 2003, Robyn Celia and Linda Krantz purchased Pappy and Harriet's.  They ushered in an era of elevated cuisine remaining true to the original Tex-Mex and booked a combination of local and big name musicians who enjoyed the small venue where they could unwind and take a break from the standard touring scene. Robyn developed the venue as a destination for musicians as well as fans, attracting all musical genres.  Linda created a family-like atmosphere for the staff, where locals and visitors felt equally welcome.  Performers such as Leon Russell, Robert Plant and more recently, Paul McCartney loved the all-in attitude of the audiences. Pappy's, as it's affectionately referred to by locals, became a home to the "High Desert Sound" including performers like Queens of the Stone Age and Jesika Rabbit (who had a nacho dish named after her).

Billboard Magazine named Pappy & Harriet's one of the Top Ten Hidden Gems in the Country in its 2012 Best Clubs issue. The club attracts artists and musicians from all over the world.

NY Times Magazine featured Pappy and Harriet's in its 2013 article "Listen Up | In The California Desert, A One Of A Kind Music Venue Blossoms."

SXSW featured the documentary The Pioneertown Palace in 2014.

Anthony Bourdain featured Pappy & Harriet's in the "US Desert" episode of his television show Anthony Bourdain: No Reservations.

Over these years, performers who have appeared at Pappy & Harriet's include Paul McCartney, Eric Burdon, Eagles of Death Metal, Queens of the Stone Age, Rufus Wainwright,  The Donnas, Grizzly Bear, Neko Case, Spiritualized, Lucinda Williams, Leon Russell, Arctic Monkeys, Daniel Lanois, Band of Horses, Alvvays, Sean Lennon, Billy Corgan and the Spirits in the Sky, Vampire Weekend, Wanda Jackson, Ricki Lee Jones, Lorde, and so many more. A surprise appearance by Robert Plant in early 2006 led to a jam with the Sunday evening house band, The Thrift Store All Stars, which featured Victoria Williams.

In 2014, Simian Mobile Disco performed/recorded their live album "Whorl" during a one-off set at Pappy & Harriet's. The set, a jam session in the desert, and a bit of studio work in London contributed to the final album.

Coachella Festival promoters Goldenvoice Productions and Santa Monica-based NPR station KCRW have presented shows at Pappy & Harriet's. The majority of bookings were generated by one of the club's former co-owners, Robyn Celia.

A Monday night Open Mic hosted by musician Ted Quinn features hundreds of performers. Most of the Open Mic performers are local or lesser-known traveling troubadours, but many established artists, including Feist, Julie Christensen, and Ke$ha have also made appearances for this low-key event.

Cracker and Camper Van Beethoven formerly held a successful annual outdoor festival, The Camp-Out, at Pappy & Harriet's. Gram Rabbit had an annual Halloween party and plays the part of The Grim Rabbit.  Americana singer-songwriter, Jim Lauderdale, performs at Pappy & Harriet's every spring in a show known as "Jim-fest."

Babes in Toyland had their first reunion show here on February 10, 2015. It marked the band's first performance in 14 years since their breakup in 2001.

2021 onward 

In the Spring of 2021, Pappy + Harriet's was sold to a married couple in the hospitality and entertainment businesses. The couple are the owner/operators and handle all music bookings and promotions in-house. In 2021, Billboard and the Los Angeles Times published reports that the relationship between members of the new ownership group had turned acrimonious and the parties had entered litigation.

Notable performances and media appearances 

2021 notable shows included Lucinda Williams, Patti Smith, Wynonna Judd, Paul Cauthen, Lukas Nelson and The Promise Of the Real, IDLES, Hailey Whitter, Jesse Daniel, Paul Cauthen, Modest Mouse, Circle Jerks, Everclear, Courtney Barnett, The Dead Kennedys, The Reverend Horton Heat, Paul McCartney, Rodrigo Amirante, The Regrettes, Elizabeth Cook, and Deep Sea Diver.

In popular culture

The building that houses Pappy & Harriet's has been used as a set in many films and television programs from the 1940s to the present.

 As "The Cantina" (before its present name and use as a music venue), the location was used as a set in several Western-themed 1950s television shows including: The Cisco Kid, The Range Rider, The Gene Autry Show, Annie Oakley, and Judge Roy Bean.
 The 1953 movie, Jeopardy, starring Barbara Stanwyck, used The Cantina set.
 Howling: New Moon Rising was shot in and around Pappy & Harriet's and Pioneertown. The film featured many of the bar's regular customers as cast members.
 The restaurant is used as a location in the documentary Nowhere Now: The Ballad of Joshua Tree.
 Pappy & Harriet's appears in the 2012 Allison Anders-Kurt Voss film, Strutter.
 The restaurant is featured in Anthony Bourdain: No Reservations "US Desert" program with the rock musician Josh Homme of the band Queens of the Stone Age.
 Mentioned in the song "Mrs. Potter's Lullaby" by Counting Crows
 The restaurant is used as a location in the 2017 feature film Ingrid Goes West.
Lucky Brand shot it's Give Back campaign in Spring 2021 featuring solo artist, Goody Grace
Wren Silva shot it's hi-fi console campaign in October 2021 www.wrensilva.com
Referenced in the show "Queens" on ABC by singer/songwriter Brandy as having been seen playing at Pappy + Harriet's in January 2022

See also
Restaurant
Honky Tonk
Roadhouse
BBQ
Juke joint
Public house
Bar
Tavern
Nightclub
Music Venue

References

External links 
 

Music venues in California
Restaurants in California
Honky-tonks